{{Automatic taxobox
| image = 
| image_caption = 
| taxon = Malayepipona
| authority = Gordani Soika, 1993
| type_species = Malayepipona pagdeni Giordani Soika, 1993 
| subdivision_ranks = Species
| subdivision = * Malayepipona assamensis Giordani Soika, 1995
 Malayepipona clypeata Nguyen & Carpenter, 2013
 Malayepipona furva Nguyen & Carpenter, 2013
 Malayepipona visenda Gusenleitner, 2012
 Malayepipona pagdeni Giordani Soika, 1993
 Malayepipona seomyty Nguyen & Carpenter, 2013
}}Malayepipona'' is an Indomalayan genus of potter wasps which contains six species.

References

Potter wasps
Hymenoptera genera